Route 46 is a highway in northern Missouri.  Its eastern terminus is at U.S. Route 69 north of Eagleville; its western terminus is at U.S. Route 59 east of Fairfax.

History
Route 46 is one of the original state highways from 1922.  Its original termini were the east and west county lines of Worth which it ran completely across.

Major intersections

References 

046
Transportation in Atchison County, Missouri
Transportation in Nodaway County, Missouri
Transportation in Worth County, Missouri
Transportation in Harrison County, Missouri